Agustín Alex Salvatierra Concha (born December 7, 1970) is a Chilean former professional footballer who played as a defender for Colo Colo, Palestino and Deportes Puerto Montt in Chile and Veracruz in Mexico. He made one appearance for Chile national team in 1996.

Teams

As player
 Colo-Colo 1987–1995
 Palestino 1996–2000
 Veracruz 2000–2001
 Deportes Puerto Montt 2001
 Perseden Denpasar 2002–2003 
 BEC Tero Sasana 2004

As manager
 Colo-Colo (youth) 2010–2020
 Colo-Colo (assistant) 2016–2018
 Colo-Colo (caretaker) 2017
 Deportes Temuco (assistant) 2022

Titles
 Colo-Colo 1989, 1990, 1991 and 1993 (Chilean Primera División Championship), 1991 (Copa Libertadores), 1992 (Recopa Sudamericana and Copa Interamericana), 1988, 1989, 1990 and 1994 (Copa Chile)

References

External links
 
 Agustín Salvatierra at PartidosdeLaRoja.com 

1970 births
Living people
Footballers from Santiago
Chilean footballers
Association football defenders
Chile international footballers
Colo-Colo footballers
Club Deportivo Palestino footballers
C.D. Veracruz footballers
Puerto Montt footballers
Perseden Denpasar players
Agustin Salvatierra
Chilean Primera División players
Agustin Salvatierra
Chilean expatriate footballers
Chilean expatriate sportspeople in Mexico
Chilean expatriate sportspeople in Indonesia
Chilean expatriate sportspeople in Thailand
Expatriate footballers in Mexico
Expatriate footballers in Indonesia
Expatriate footballers in Thailand
Chilean football managers
Colo-Colo managers
Chilean Primera División managers